In Camera is the fourth solo album from the English singer-songwriter Peter Hammill. It was released in July 1974.

Much of the material was recorded in Hammill's home studio on simple four-track equipment. He then took the tapes to Trident Studios, where additional elements such as drumming from Van der Graaf Generator colleague Guy Evans, and layers of ARP 2600 analogue synthesizer were added. The album has a predominantly dark, gothic, claustrophobic feel, with the lyrics laced with apocalyptic, religious and existential imagery. "Gog" is a particularly intense and demonic song, featuring (even by Hammill's standards) strident and aggressive vocals, grandiose harmonium chords, and powerful drumming. This segués into "Magog", which is virtually a musique concrète piece of sinister drones, percussive noises, and including a ring modulated spoken vocal. Songs such as "Ferret and Featherbird" and "Again" are gentler offerings, and Hammill refers to the first as "something approaching a 'sweet' song". The album was dedicated to Hammill's brother, Andrew.

"Again" was re-worked for Hammill's 1984 album The Love Songs.

Track listing

Some CDs index "Gog" and "Magog..." as one track.

Personnel 
 Peter Hammill – vocals, piano , acoustic and electric guitars , bass guitar , ARP 2600 synthesizer , Mellotron , harmonium 
 Guy Evans – drums 
 Chris Judge Smith – percussion, backing vocals 
 Paul Whitehead – percussion

Technical
Peter Hammill – recording engineer (Sofa Sound, Sussex)
 David Hentschel – recording engineer, ARP programming, mixing, "studio wizardry" (Trident Studios, London)

References

External links
 Album information on the unofficial VdGG site

Peter Hammill albums
1974 albums
Charisma Records albums
Albums recorded at Trident Studios
Existentialist works